John Barry Webster (born 3 March 1935) is an English former professional footballer who played in the Football League for Rotherham United and Bradford City. He scored the opening goal of Rotherham's 2–0 win in the first leg of the 1961 Football League Cup Final, but opponents Aston Villa came back in the second leg to win the inaugural edition of the competition 3–2 on aggregate after extra time. After leaving Bradford, he joined Buxton.

References

1935 births
Living people
English footballers
Rotherham United F.C. players
Bradford City A.F.C. players
Buxton F.C. players
English Football League players
Association football forwards